Devarshola is a panchayat town in The Nilgiris district  in the state of Tamil Nadu, India.

Demographics
 India census, Devarshola had a population of 23,085. Males constitute 50% of the population and females 50%. Devarshola has an average literacy rate of 68%, higher than the national average of 59.5%: male literacy is 75% and, female literacy is 62%. In Devarshola, 13% of the population is under 6 years of age.  Pincode : 643207.

References

Cities and towns in Nilgiris district